The Battle of Noisseville on 31 August 1870 was fought during the Franco-Prussian War and ended in a Prussian victory.

Traveling from Metz, the French forces under Marshal François Achille Bazaine attempted to break through the investing line of the Prussian forces under Prince Frederick Charles. At first, the French had slight success, and maintained the ground they won during the day. But on 1 September the French were driven back into Metz, with a loss of 3,379 soldiers and 145 officers. The Prussians lost 2,850 soldiers and 126 officers.

References
George Bruce. Harbottle's Dictionary of Battles. (Van Nostrand Reinhold, 1981).

Battle of Noiseville
Conflicts in 1870
Battles involving France
Battles of the Franco-Prussian War
Battles involving Prussia
Noisseville
August 1870 events
September 1870 events